Volpaia is a village in Tuscany, central Italy, administratively a frazione of the comune of Radda in Chianti, province of Siena. At the time of the 2001 census its population amounted to 44.

Main sights
San Lorenzo, main parish church of the village
Castello di Volpaia

References

Bibliography
 Stopani, R and Moretti, I (1972). "Volpaia", Fattoria Castello di Volpaia.

External links
 Castello di Volpaia Official Website

 Chianti Classico Wine Producers Association

Wineries of Italy
Frazioni of Radda in Chianti